Bartolomeo Altomonte, also known as Bartholomäus Hohenberg (24 February 1694, in Warsaw – 11 November 1783, in Sankt Florian), was an Austrian baroque painter who specialized in large scale frescoes. He was the son of Martino Altomonte, also a painter.

Biography
Altomonte was born in Warsaw, where his father, Martino Altomonte, had been appointed to the court of Jan Sobieskis. He was the third of six children. Altomonte spent most of his life in Linz and worked primarily in Austrian monasteries such as St. Florian's Priory and Admont Abbey. He learned from assisting his father at painting, but also from an apprenticeship with Daniel Gran. Tendencies towards the rococo remained foreign to the artist all his life; he is considered one of the last great painters in the manner of the baroque allegory.

References

Bibliography

External links

Entry for Bartolomeo Altomonte on the Union List of Artist Names

Baroque painters
1694 births
1783 deaths
Artists from Warsaw
18th-century Austrian painters
18th-century Austrian male artists
Austrian male painters